The 1788–89 United States presidential election in Georgia took place between December 15, 1788 – January 10, 1789 as part of the 1788–89 United States presidential election. The state legislature chose 5 representatives, or electors to the Electoral College, who voted for President and Vice President.

Georgia, which had become the 4th state on January 2, 1788, unanimously cast its 5 electoral votes for George Washington during its first presidential election.

References

Georgia
1788-1789
United States President